The Obscure Spring is a 2014 Mexican erotic drama film directed by Ernesto Contreras.

Cast
Cecilia Suárez as Flora
Irene Azuela as Pina
José María Yazpik as Igor
Flavio Medina as Sandro

Reception
On review aggregator website Rotten Tomatoes the film has a score of 67% based on reviews from 6 critics, with an average rating of 7.5/10.

References

External links

Mexican drama films
2010s Mexican films